Nikita Dmitryevich Mazepin (born 2 March 1999) is a  Russian professional racing driver who most recently competed in the 2023 Asian Le Mans Series driving for 99 Racing.

A formula racing driver for much of his career, he previously raced in Formula One for Haas F1 Team in the 2021 Formula One World Championship under the Russian Automobile Federation. Due to the Russian invasion of Ukraine, Haas terminated the agreement with the pilot, as well as with the title sponsor - the Russian company Uralkali.

Personal life
He is the son of Dmitry Mazepin, a Belarusian-Russian oligarch businessman who is the former core shareholder and former chairman of Uralchem.

On 9 December 2020, Mazepin posted an Instagram story in which he appeared to inappropriately grope a woman's breasts. In a statement, the Haas F1 Team rebuked Mazepin's actions and called the video "abhorrent". Mazepin also released an apology, stating "I have to hold myself to a higher standard as a Formula 1 driver and I acknowledge I have let myself and many people down", but the apology was deleted nine days later. In March 2021, Mazepin reiterated that he understood his actions were wrong. The woman in the video defended Mazepin and labelled his actions as a joke between the two. The woman has since posted content on her own social media stating "never let them touch you again or be disrespectful to you" and the two have since unfollowed each other. The controversy led to the hashtag "#WeSayNoToMazepin" to trend on Twitter, calling for Mazepin's removal from the Haas F1 Team.

In March 2022, Nikita and Dmitry were included on the EU sanctions list, following the 2022 Russian invasion of Ukraine.

Following his dismissal from Formula One, Mazepin created "We Compete as One", a foundation to support athletes excluded for "political reasons".

Career

Karting career
Having won the Russian Karting championship, Mazepin started his international karting career in 2011 in the Trofeo Andrea Margutti. He quickly moved up the ranks, driving in the CIK-FIA Karting European Championship in the KF3 class in just his second year of competition. In 2013 he finished fourth in the KFJ-category of the WSK Super Master Series, and in 2014, his final year of karting, he came 2nd in the Karting World Championship to Lando Norris.

Lower formulae
Mazepin made his car racing debut in the MRF Challenge Formula 2000 at the end of 2014, driving in the first round of the series and grabbing his first podium in just his second race of his single-seater career. He then made the switch to compete in the Toyota Racing Series with ETEC Motorsport, where he finished 18th in the drivers' standings. He followed that up by racing for Josef Kaufmann Racing in the Formula Renault Northern European Cup alongside Louis Delétraz, Kevin Jörg and fellow rookie Dries Vanthoor. Mazepin scored one podium with a third-place finish at the Red Bull Ring, and ended up twelfth in the championship.

Formula 3 European Championship

2016
In 2016, Mazepin competed in the 2016 FIA Formula 3 European Championship for Hitech Grand Prix. He scored four points-scoring finishes and finished 20th in the championship, last of all full-time entrants. After being blocked during a session by Callum Ilott, Mazepin got into an altercation with the other driver, during which Mazepin hit Ilott in the face, resulting in a ban from the first race of the Hungaroring meeting. The sanction itself was controversial, with Frits van Amersfoort, boss of Ilott's team, believing the decision to be too lenient, calling it "a ridiculous decision by the stewards".

2017
Despite the controversies of 2016, Mazepin was retained for another season. He improved significantly compared to his first year, scoring 108 points and finishing on the podium on three occasions. He finished in tenth, one place behind teammate Ralf Aron.

GP3 Series

Mazepin moved to GP3 in 2018 to race for ART Grand Prix alongside Callum Ilott, Jake Hughes and eventual champion Anthoine Hubert. He won four races, the most of any driver that year, and finished second in the championship, only 16 points behind Hubert. Furthermore, he helped his team secure the title in the team championship.

FIA Formula 2 Championship

2019

In 2019, Mazepin progressed to Formula 2 to partner Nyck de Vries at ART Grand Prix. His season was marked by causing an accident with Nobuharu Matsushita in the sprint race at the Sochi Autodrom. While his teammate ended up winning the championship, Mazepin ended the season in 18th place with 11 points.

2020
In 2020, he signed for the new Hitech Grand Prix Team to drive alongside Italian Luca Ghiotto. His first podium came at the Hungaroring with second place, before taking his first F2 victory in Britain. Mazepin also won the feature race at Mugello. On the final lap of the Belgian feature race, he pushed Carlin Motorsport driver Yuki Tsunoda wide, and was given a five-second time penalty, denying himself victory.

Formula One

Mazepin was named test driver of Sahara Force India in 2016 and made his Formula One testing debut in the in-season test at Silverstone, where he achieved a personal best lap time of 1:31.561. He stayed in that role for the following two seasons, racking up 100 laps at the Hungaroring in 2017 and 51 in 2018 at the same track. The following year he took part for Mercedes in the 2019 Barcelona test, where he topped the timing sheets with a time of 1:15.775.

Haas (2021)

2021

Mazepin joined Haas F1 Team for 2021 on a multi-year deal, partnering Mick Schumacher. He chose the number 9 as his permanent racing number. Mazepin competed under a neutral flag representing the Russian Automobile Federation in the 2021 and 2022 Formula One World Championships after the Court of Arbitration for Sport upheld a World Anti-Doping Agency ban on Russia competing at World Championships in December 2020 due to state-sponsored doping of Russian athletes.

In his debut race, Mazepin crashed out on the first lap by losing control on the kerb at turn three. After finishing last in the Emilia Romagna Grand Prix, having spun twice in practice and blocked Antonio Giovinazzi in qualifying, Mazepin was given a five-second penalty for ignoring blue flags and blocking Sergio Pérez during the Portuguese Grand Prix. His first race in which he beat teammate Schumacher came in Monaco, and Mazepin achieved his best result of the season at the following round in Azerbaijan. At the 2021 Belgian Grand Prix in Spa-Francorchamps, which only lasted two laps behind the Safety Car due to heavy rain, Mazepin recorded the fastest lap of the race on the second lap; however, as the race was suspended permanently thereafter, the official results were taken from the end of the race's first full lap, and as a consequence, Mazepin's fastest lap award was rescinded.

Mazepin missed the season finale at Yas Marina due to a positive COVID-test on race day; he was not replaced for the event. He ended his debut season 21st in the standings, with no points scored throughout the year.

2022
Mazepin was contracted to compete for Haas in the 2022 Formula One World Championship, however on 5 March, Haas terminated both his contract and Uralkali's title sponsorship as part of the larger global response to the 2022 Russian invasion of Ukraine. Mazepin expressed disappointment at the decision, remarking on social media that his "ongoing willingness to accept the conditions proposed in order to continue were completely ignored". In a BBC interview, Mazepin stated that the sports sanctions were "cancel culture" against Russia. Mazepin also stated that he sees "tremendous risks in saying anything at all" regarding the Russian invasion of Ukraine.

In July 2022, Mazepin sued Haas in a Swiss court for unpaid wages. During the month, he told Match TV that despite his exit, he still follows Formula One closely when possible.

Rally raid
A self-professed rally raid fan, Mazepin participated in a test with Dakar Rally-winning truck team Kamaz Master in July 2021. Following his departure from Formula One in 2022, he expressed interest in switching to rally raid should he not return to F1. In his July 2022 interview with Match TV, Mazepin explained he intended to compete in off-road as long as he enjoyed it, and joked he would continue to do so if he could "physically walk and get into the car" as "there is no age limit in this sport."

To gain experience, he began training with former Dakar quad category winner Sergey Karyakin and his Snag Racing team. Karyakin described Mazepin as knowing "how to read the lines perfectly, he sees the dunes" and that "bearing in mind that it was the first time he tested the sand, the results were quite good."

Mazepin made his rally debut at the Ladoga Trophy in June 2022 before competing in the Silk Way Rally a month later, driving a Can-Am in the T3 category for Snag Racing. He won his class with a stage victory in the seventh leg. Speaking to TASS after the rally, Mazepin said rally raid and Formula One's lone similarities were "the steering wheel and four wheels. It was very hot, very challenging, and it was the real test. I am incredibly happy that I managed to win."

Asian Le Mans Series 
In 2023, Mazepin returned to international motorsport, making his endurance racing debut in the Asian Le Mans Series with 99 Racing. At the first race in Dubai, Mazepin, along with teammates Neel Jani and Gonçalo Gomes, finished on the podium, with Jani narrowly losing out on second to Charlie Eastwood during the final stint.

Karting record

Karting career summary

Complete CIK-FIA Karting European Championship results
(key) (Races in bold indicate pole position) (Races in italics indicate fastest lap)

Complete Karting World Championship results

Racing record

Racing career summary

† As Mazepin was a guest driver, he was ineligible for points.

Complete Toyota Racing Series results
(key) (Races in bold indicate pole position) (Races in italics indicate fastest lap)

Complete Formula Renault 2.0 Northern European Cup results
(key) (Races in bold indicate pole position) (Races in italics indicate fastest lap)

Complete FIA Formula 3 European Championship results
(key) (Races in bold indicate pole position) (Races in italics indicate fastest lap)

Complete Macau Grand Prix results

Complete GP3 Series results
(key) (Races in bold indicate pole position) (Races in italics indicate fastest lap)

Complete FIA Formula 2 Championship results
(key) (Races in bold indicate pole position) (Races in italics indicate points for the fastest lap of top ten finishers)

† Did not finish, but was classified as he had completed more than 90% of the race distance.

Complete F3 Asian Championship results
(key) (Races in bold indicate pole position) (Races in italics indicate fastest lap)

Complete Formula One results

Notes

References

External links
 
 

1999 births
Sportspeople from Moscow
Living people
Russian people of Belarusian descent
Russian racing drivers
Formula Renault 2.0 NEC drivers
Formula Renault Eurocup drivers
BRDC British Formula 3 Championship drivers
FIA Formula 3 European Championship drivers
Russian GP3 Series drivers
FIA Formula 2 Championship drivers
F3 Asian Championship drivers
Haas Formula One drivers
Neutral Formula One drivers
Josef Kaufmann Racing drivers
Hitech Grand Prix drivers
AV Formula drivers
Carlin racing drivers
ART Grand Prix drivers
Off-road racing drivers
Karting World Championship drivers
Asian Le Mans Series drivers
Russian individuals subject to European Union sanctions